Ray Shell (born 22 September 1951) is an American film, TV and stage actor, as well as an author, singer, director and producer. He is known for creating the roles of Nomax in Five Guys Named Moe (1990) and Rusty in Starlight Express (1984). He is a Creative Director of the Giant Olive Theatre Company, resident company at the Lion & Unicorn Theatre in Kentish Town, London. Shell is the author of the 1993 novel Iced.

Early life 
Born in Wilson County, North Carolina, he moved with his mother to Brooklyn, New York, when he was two years old; in a 2018 interview, he said: "My name should be Ayries Lancaster because James Lancaster Jr. was my biological father. Charles Shell is the name of my father who adopted me at 13. I named myself Ray because I got tired of people murdering my first name."

In 1970, Shell went to Emerson College in Boston, Massachusetts, where he studied acting, literature and mass communications, graduating with a BFA in 1974.

After graduation, Shell toured in the national companies of national companies of Hair and The Me Nobody Knows, before being cast in the title role of "the first soul gospel musical" Little Willie Jr’s Resurrection, Oscar L. Johnson and Lon Satton, traveling with the show to London, England, in November 1978.

Career
After arriving in London in 1978 with Little Willie Jr's Resurrection, Shell immediately became part of London's New Wave music scene, recording as a vocalist with Howard Devoto's Magazine, covering Kate Bush's "Them Heavy People". He went on to record with his own band The Street Angels featuring a "pre-Simon Cowell" Sinitta, Carl McKintosh and Charita Jones.

On the UK stage, Shell originated lead roles in the musicals Starlight Express (1984) and Five Guys Named Moe (1990).

In 1993, Shell's novel Iced was first published by Flamingo/HarperCollins in the UK (Random House in the US), to commercial success. Described in a cover blurb by Maya Angelou as "a powerhouse", Iced tells the story of an upper-middle-class black American man destroying himself with crack-cocaine. In 1997, The Black Theatre Co-operative toured a stage adaptation of the book, in collaboration with the Nottingham Playhouse, including a sell-out run at the Tricycle Theatre.

In 2008, Shell wrote about his appearance in, and the closure of, the musical Gone with the Wind for The Guardian newspaper.

In summer 2011, Shell was the performance coach for Adrian Grant's Respect La Diva starring Sheila Ferguson, Zoe Birkett, Katy Satterfield, Denise Pearson and Andy Abraham. In winter 2011, Shell was James Earl Jones's understudy for in the London West End production of Driving Miss Daisy, starring Boyd Gaines and Vanessa Redgrave in the title role.

In March 2012, Shell's TAIP (Total Artist in Production) produced The Gaddafi Club, a new play. In spring 2012, Shell toured the UK as MC Romeo Marcell in Dancing in the Streets. In 2012, he directed A Dream Across the Ocean, a new British musical produced by Samuel Facey and Dave Prince from ChurchBoyz Entertainment.

Also in 2013, Street Angels Books published Spike Lee: The Eternal Maverick, a biography by Shell. In 2015, Shell began production of the film version of Iced and published Feedin' Miranda, a new novel. He also appeared as Bill Devaney in the newly created West End musical The Bodyguard, based on the movie of the same name. He appeared as The Bishop in the Bush Theatre's 2014 production of Perseverance Drive; Shell also established his popular London TAIP (Total Actor In Production) sessions at the Ripley Grier Studios in New York City.

Shell is also the author of the novels Carolina Red and An Eye, A Tooth.

Personal Life
Ray is married to the restaurateur Momma Cherri, and their daughter Katryna Thomas-Shell is an actress and producer.

Credits

Theatre
 Rusty in Starlight Express
 Poppa in The New Starlight Express
 Pork in Gone With the Wind
 Narrator in Dancing in the Streets
 Ain't Misbehavin'
 Jesus Christ Superstar
 Miss Saigon
 Mass Carib
 Little Willies Jr
 Children of Eden
 125th Street
 The Lion King
 Golden Boy
 Nomax in Five Guys Named Moe
 Sweeney Todd in Sweeney Todd: The Demon Barber of Fleet Street
 Vernon God Little
 Happy End
 Two Trains Running
 Perseverance Drive
 The Barber Shop Chronicles
 Hair
 Driving Miss Daisy
 Bill Devaney in The Bodyguard

DVD and video
 Andrew Lloyd Webber: The Royal Albert Hall Celebration

Film and TV
 American Voices as Elmer Thomas
 Too Much Sun as Transvestite (episode: "Cross Purposes)
 Velvet Goldmine as Murray
 Pirate Prince as Darbo
 Young Soul Rebels as Jeff Kane
 Breakfast with Frost as himself
 Screen Two as From the Rear Window (episode: "The McGuffin")
 The Apple as Shake

Recordings
 Starlight Express: Original London Cast Recording
 Only You
 The Apple
 Andrew Lloyd Webber: The Royal Albert Hall Celebration
 Children of Eden: Original London Cast Recording

Own work
 Iced
 Flatshare
 Frederick Avery Visits
 Street Angels
 ZIP
 The Gaddafi Club
 White Folks

References

External links
 
 Lastminute.com Interview 13 October 2005.
 Peter Liciaga, "Ray Shell, Starlight Express’ Greatest Volume 1", PeterLiciaga.com, 14 July 2021.
 Ray Shell at OWN IT!.

1951 births
Living people
20th-century African-American male singers
20th-century African-American writers
20th-century American male actors
20th-century American novelists
21st-century African-American people
21st-century American male actors
African-American directors
African-American male actors
African-American male writers
African-American novelists
American male film actors
American male stage actors
American male television actors
Male actors from New York City